Pietro Broccini (2 January 1928, in Portovenere, La Spezia – 2 September 2006, in Sanremo, Imperia) was an Italian football (soccer) player in the midfielder role.

In his career, he played 33 Serie A matches with Inter Milan and won two Italian titles in 1953 and 1954.

He played also with Spal Ferrara from 1954 to 1959 and Sanremese from 1959 to 1961.

He died at 78 years old.

External links
Profile at Enciclopediadelcalcio.it

1928 births
2006 deaths
Sportspeople from the Province of La Spezia
Italian footballers
Association football midfielders
Serie A players
Serie B players
U.C. Sampdoria players
S.P.A.L. players
Inter Milan players
S.S.D. Sanremese Calcio players
Spezia Calcio players
Venezia F.C. players
Carrarese Calcio players
Footballers from Liguria